The Conkouati-Douli National Park is a UNESCO-recognised coastal national park in the Republic of the Congo. The park's main activities include community outreach, biological research and tourism development.

The national park was established by the Presidential Decree No. 99-136 on 14 August 1999, it covers an area of 5,049.5 km2 and located in the Kouilou Department, straddling the districts of Nzambi-Madingo and Kayes.

It is located near the villages of Cotovindou and Louléma along the border between Congo and Gabon, at the point of intersection with National Route 5. 

Conkouati-Douli National Park is managed by the Ministry of Forest Economy and Durable Development (MEFDD) in partnership with the Wildlife Conservation Society (WCS). The responsibilities of both partners are outlined in an agreement protocol.

In 2014, park coordination was assured by the conservator/coordinator of MEFDD and a Principal Technical Advisor of WCS. They are assisted by an assistant conservator (MEFDD) and an administrator/accountant (WCS).

The park employs 70 permanent employees of whom 95% are recruited locally. The park surveillance team consisted of 36 guards in early 2014. During the annual marine turtle nesting season between October and March, an additional 30 people are recruited locally to monitor the beaches.

The park is divided into three zones:

 An integrally protected zone that is only legally accessible for park staff, guided paying tourists and researchers with valid permits;
 An eco-development zone containing all legal human habitations, in which residents are allowed to use natural resources sustainably for subsistence, and in which industrial exploitation is allowed with the agreement of the appropriate government institutions;
 A 5 km wide buffer zone around the park designated for environmental education, sensitisation efforts and socio-economic activities.

History
The Conkouati-Douli National Park was established on August 14, 1999, however the park has been part of an active area of conservation since at least 1980 and includes areas of the former old reserve of Conkouati.

This reserve covered nearly 300,000 hectares but was reduced down to 144,294 hectares by a legal provision in 1989. 

From 1994 to 1999 the IUCN recognised that the area was critically endangered and collaborated with PROGECAP-GEF Congo with financing from the World Bank in agreement with the Congolese authorities until June 1999. 

After being promoted to a national park, Conkouati-Douli has been managed by the Ministry for National Forestry Commission in partnership with the Wildlife Conservation Society (WCS) since 1999.

The park is an important part of native local culture. In 2014, some 7,000 people lived in and around the park: 3,500 people spread across 14 villages along the coastal road and 3,500 people in 14 villages along the forest road.

The coastal residents are mainly Vili people, an ethnic group of fishers and traders that settled there in the 13th century. The villages along the forest road contain a mix of over 30 different ethnic groups who came with the industrial forestry sector and settled fewer than 100 years ago.

Geography, flora and fauna
Conkouati-Douli National Park is the most bio diverse park in the country and includes the only marine-protected area in Congo.

Home to fauna typical of forest ecosystems of the Congo including elephant, buffalo, gorillas, leopards, chimpanzees, red river hogs, sitatunga and mandrill.  The park also has a number of endangered turtle and dolphin populations.

The Noumbi River flows through the park, which is characterised by dense forests, mixed with wetlands, floodplain forests and lagoons. Rhizophora racemosa and Avicennia nititta are common mangroves in the park and aquatic vegetation in lakes and lagoons is composed of Vossia cuspidata and Ctenium newtonili.

Savannahs of the south-west are dominated by Ctenium newtonili, Elytonrus brazzae and Pobeguinea arrecta, while those of Cotovindou in the north-east are made up of Hypparrhenia diplandra, Panicum phragmitoides, and Pobeguinea arrecta.

It is a priority site for great apes in the IUCN great ape conservation action plan as it is home to around 8,000 central chimpanzees (Pan troglodytes) and 2,000 western lowland gorillas (Gorilla gorilla gorilla).

The park also houses some 1,000 forest elephants (Loxodonta africana cyclotis) and is a Ramsar site for its importance for migratory and wetland birds.

Its beaches are among the most important in the world for nesting of leatherback turtles (Dermochelys coriacea).

The marine park also includes a group of around 50 humpback dolphins (Sousa teuzsi).

Threats to conservation
Local ecosystems are vulnerable to industrial threats from logging, mining, petroleum production, and commercial fishing.

Additionally, poachers commonly use the coastal and south-east forest roads traversing the park to gain access to rare animals such as elephants.

The local human population is low but the nearby city of Pointe-Noire (150 km from the park) fuels natural resource exploitation to feed the growing demands for bushmeat and wood.

Chinese-owned trawler boats are a serious threat to the marine park. Local threats include unsustainable fishing, hunting and agriculture techniques.

References

External links
UNESCO site 
HELP
Pointe Noire Alive! - Latest news for Park visitors 

National parks of the Republic of the Congo
Protected areas established in 1999
1999 establishments in the Republic of the Congo
Western Congolian forest–savanna mosaic